Roger D. Thomas (born December 13, 1950) is the Iowa State Representative from the 55th District. He served in the Iowa House of Representatives from 1997 to 2001 in the 32nd District and from 2003 to 2011 in the 24th District. He received his BS from Upper Iowa University.

, Thomas serves on several committees in the Iowa House - the Natural Resources, Veterans Affairs, and Ways and Means committees.  He also serves as ranking member of the Economic Growth Committee and as a member of the Economic Development Authority Board.  His prior political experience includes service as a trustee for Northeast Iowa Community College.

Electoral history 
Thomas was first elected in 1996, defeating incumbent Republican Roger Halvorson. He left his House seat in 2001, in an unsuccessful bid for the Iowa Senate's 16th District, following incumbent Republican Lyle Zieman's retirement from the Senate. He lost the election to Republican Mark Zieman, the former senator's son. He was succeeded in the 32nd District by Republican Leigh Rekow. He contested the newly redrawn 24th District in 2003, defeating Rekow.

On March 13, 2014 Thomas announced he would not seek reelection to the Iowa House.

*incumbent

References

External links

Representative Roger Thomas official Iowa General Assembly site
Roger Thomas State Representative official constituency site
Representative Roger Thomas official campaign site
 

Democratic Party members of the Iowa House of Representatives
Living people
1950 births
People from Oelwein, Iowa
People from Elkader, Iowa
Upper Iowa University alumni